A synthoid is a fictional type of artificial lifeform. The term originated on the television cartoon series G.I. Joe: A Real American Hero, produced by Sunbow in the mid-1980s. It has since been used in other media as well.

As used in G.I. Joe
The term "synthoid" was first seen in the two-part episode "The Synthoid Conspiracy" of the G.I. Joe cartoon show. This stealth replicate technology was developed by Zartan, the master of disguise, in service to the Cobra terrorist organization.

Synthoids seem to be molded from a biomimetic polymer-like material which can be programmed to assume human form, duplicating clothing, voice, and behavioural characteristics of the original subject. (In this respect, the synthoid concept is comparable to the android T-1000 from the 1991 science fiction film Terminator 2: Judgment Day, but predating said movie by six years.) Created for deception and infiltration operations, synthoid units can superficially pass for genuine human beings, exhibiting intelligence and autonomous personality, albeit with loyalties ever acting in Cobra's interests. All synthoids are equipped with a self-destruct mechanism which can be remotely triggered to dissolve their bodies into the formless gray goo of their initial constitution—perhaps suggesting a conceptual origin in literary trappings of nanotechnology.

Cobra first used the synthoids to replace several G.I. Joe military commanders (including Duke, USS Flagg commander Admiral Ledger, Colonel Sharp, General Franks, and General Howe of the U.S. Air Force) in a plot to undermine the team's fighting capability. Cobra Commander and Zartan also tried to replace Destro with a synthoid as well. With the synthoids posing as Congressional Budget Committee members, the faux commanders proceeded to issue budget cuts and imposed crippling supply restrictions, aiming to eventually disband the Joe Team. Although their resources were strained to desperation, the Joes eventually caught wind of Cobra's plan with the help of Destro and managed to deflate it, rescuing the real committee. As for the synthoids, the one impersonating Duke approached Cobra Commander and gave his identity; when the Commander impulsively decided to dissolve him to verify his identity, however, he initiated the function at far too high a setting, causing all of the synthoids to deactivate and exposing their presence in the U.S. military.

In the two-part episode "There's No Place Like Springfield", Cobra employed synthoids en masse in a scheme to extract classified information from G.I. Joe team member Shipwreck, who had secret weapons knowledge imparted to him under hypnotic suggestion. Cobra manages to covertly capture Shipwreck, placing him under unknowing surveillance in a mock town peopled with synthoid duplicates of his acquaintances in the hope of coercing the secret information from him. This version was upgraded so that the mass of the synthoid could be reconstituted for repeated use. This was the last instance of synthoids appearing in the G.I. Joe cartoon.

In other media
The synthoid technology later resurfaced in another Sunbow-produced series, The Transformers. In the episode "Only Human", a terrorist named Old Snake—ostensibly an aging Cobra Commander—captures several Autobots and downloads their personalities from their robot form into synthoid bodies.

Synthoids were also seen in Batman Beyond, being artificial lifeforms featuring technical specifications very similar to those of the G.I. Joe counterparts. The most prominent synthoid of the show was Zeta (who also received his own spin-off show), an infiltration unit designed to seek and destroy specific people, and had the ability to holographically disguise himself as any individual he had seen, as well as create custom appearances through mixing physical traits of those individuals. In the show, the term "synthoid" was sometimes used interchangeably with "robot". Whether this usage is colloquial (and thus technologically erroneous) was not revealed.

A similar technology was created in Kim Possible here called "synthodrone". While apparently created for use as soldiers, it is used for the purpose of distracting the titular character with her ideal boyfriend. Unlike previous examples the synthodrone seems to be an organic goo housed in a special humanoid sleeve, which when damaged by puncture shuts down.

Men in Black Animated series also features this technology, to minimize loses of real human personnel at highly dangerous missions against the Aliens or to erase trace of evidence if an agent identity compromised.

An android technology similar to synthoids were in the pilot of the series Otherworld.

References

See also
 Android
 Cyborg
 Humanoid robot
 Nanomorph
 Batman Beyond (The Zeta Project)
 The Sentinel (video game)
 Vision (Marvel Comics)

G.I. Joe
Fictional robots